Love Everlasting is a 2016 American teen romance film starring Lucky Blue Smith, directed by Rob Diamond.

Plot
High school senior Bridger Jenkins (Lucky Blue Smith), and his mother Helen (Emily Procter), flee an abusive step-father and husband in Missouri with $197 to their names, and end up in the small town of Greenville, Utah when their truck breaks down.  Local mechanic Will Simms (Shawn Stevens) gives them temporary lodging.  Will's daughter Clover (Christie Burke) is very shy, and secretly a cutter, haunted by a past incident that left a scar on her left cheek.  Bridger also has a scar, on his chest, from a childhood heart transplant.  They grow closer, but both face the torment of school bully Bo Chinsley (Austin R. Grant).

Cast
 Lucky Blue Smith as Bridger
 Emily Procter as Helen
 Christie Burke as Clover
 Shawn Stevens as Will
 Austin R. Grant as Bo
 Landon Henneman as Roman
 Garet Allen as Albert

Production
The movie was partly filmed in Utah, where Smith grew up, and takes advantage of the scenic beauty of the area.  Smith is best known as a model and the film was his acting debut. His father, Dallon Smith, was one of the three producers of the film.

It premiered at the Vista Theatre in Los Angeles on November 9, 2016, and had a limited theatrical release in Utah theaters on February 10, 2017.

The movie received mixed reviews, with The Salt Lake Tribune calling it a "a nicely acted but predictably tragic young-adult romance."  It was also described as a mix of The Fault in Our Stars and Romeo and Juliet. It also received numerous nominations for the 2017 Utah Film Awards, and Shawn Stevens won for Feature Supporting Actor.

The film is unrated, but the director predicts it would have received a PG or PG-13 rating in the United States.

References

External links
 Love Everlasting at IMDB
 Love Everlasting at Rotten Tomatoes
 Getty images from premiere

2016 films
2010s high school films
American high school films
Films shot in Utah
2010s English-language films
2010s American films